The Chaks, are a community inhabiting the Chittagong Hill Tracts of Bangladesh and also in Burma.

History
The Chaks entered the Chittagong Hill Tracts in the 14th century after their kingdom was overrun by the Arakanese. Still there are Chaks living in Arakan.

References

Ethnic groups in Bangladesh